The Wireless Router Application Platform (WRAP) is a format of single board computer defined by Swiss company PC Engines.  This is specially designed for wireless router, firewall, load balancer, VPN or other network appliances.

Basic specs
32-bit  x86 compatible CPU, low energy consumption (AMD Geode SC1100 at 266 MHz)
supports MMX instructions
64-bit SDRAM memory controller (max: 89 MHz)
PCI bus controller
IDE interfaces
ACPI 1.0-compatible power management
tinyBIOS : Made specially by PC Engines
64 or 128MB SDRAM
Compact flash memory (includes boot OS)
Monitoring: watchdog timer, LM77 thermal monitor
Power supply: 7V ~ 18V external DC power or Power over Ethernet
LAN: National semiconductor DP83816
I/O: MiniPCI slots, console serial port

Different boards
There are three different models of the WRAP:

The WRAP 1-1 has two Ethernet ports, and two mini-PCI slots, on a 16x16cm board.
The WRAP 1-2 has three Ethernet ports and one mini-PCI slot, on a 16x16cm board.
The WRAP 2 has one Ethernet port, and two mini-PCI slots, on a 10x16cm board.

Operating System
The WRAP is capable of running many different operating systems, including various Linux distributions, FreeBSD, NetBSD, OpenBSD, as well as proprietary OSes. The WRAP lacks a keyboard controller (for obvious reasons), so some OSes that rely on one for the boot process may have to be modified.

End Of Life (EOL)
PC Engines announced the end of life for the WRAP platform in 2007. The board was replaced by the ALIX.

External links
PC Engines information page on the WRAP
BowlFish 
Routers (computing)
Router